Gavdel (also Romanized as Gāvdel; also known as Gāvdūl) is a village in Owch Hacha Rural District, in the Central District of Ahar County, East Azerbaijan Province, Iran. At the 2006 census, its population was 121, in 26 families.

References 

Populated places in Ahar County